Gabriella Pescucci (born 17 January 1943) is an Italian costume designer. She has worked with directors Pier Paolo Pasolini, Federico Fellini, Sergio Leone, Terry Gilliam, Martin Scorsese, Tim Burton and Neil Jordan. In 1994, she won the Oscar for Best Costume Design for the 1993 film The Age of Innocence.

Biography
Gabriella Pescucci was born in Tuscany in the province of Livorno. She studied Art at Accademia, Florence. In 1966 moved to Rome with the express intention of becoming a costume designer for the cinema. She began her career as an assistant to Piero Tosi on the sets of Pasolini's Medea and Visconti's Death in Venice. Pescucci took her first steps in cinema with Giuseppe Patroni Griffi at the start of the 70s, designing costumes that took inspiration from paintings by Carpaccio and Leonardo.

Her international debut was in 1984 with Once Upon a Time in America, for which she won the first of her two BAFTA Awards, the second being for The Adventures of Baron Munchausen by director Terry Gilliam and production designer Dante Ferretti.

She received many other nominations and awards, among which a David di Donatello with The Name of the Rose and an Oscar for The Age of Innocence in 1993. Some of her most popular works include costume design on Charlie and the Chocolate Factory, Les Misérables and Agora.

In addition to her film and television work she has designed for the Opera, notably La Traviata at La Scala, Un ballo in maschera at the Kennedy Centre in Washington, D.C., and La bohème in Florence.

Credits

Curiosities
Pescucci was the costume designer for the failed Terry Gilliam project The Man Who Killed Don Quixote.

References

External links 

1941 births
Living people
People from the Province of Livorno
Italian costume designers
Best Costume Design Academy Award winners
Best Costume Design BAFTA Award winners
David di Donatello winners
Nastro d'Argento winners
Ciak d'oro winners
Women costume designers